Tatyana Grigorenko (born 1 September 1984) is a Belarusian gymnast. She competed at the 2000 Summer Olympics.

References

External links
 

1984 births
Living people
Belarusian female artistic gymnasts
Olympic gymnasts of Belarus
Gymnasts at the 2000 Summer Olympics
Sportspeople from Grodno